Dehghan may refer to:
 Dehqan, class of land magnates in Iran
 Dehqan, Iran (disambiguation)
 Shaghayegh Dehghan
 Zahra Dehghan
 Saeed Kamali Dehghan